Laxman Pai (21 January 1926 – 14 March 2021) was an Indian artist and painter. He was a principal of the Goa College of Art, a post he held from 1977 to 1987. Pai was a recipient of several awards including India's third highest civilian honour of Padma Bhushan, awarded by the Government of India.

Early life
Pai was born in a Gaud Saraswat Brahmin family in Margao, Goa, on 21 January 1926. His tryst with art was at his uncle's R N Mauzo's Mauzo Photo Studio in Margao, where he used to touch up the black and white photographs with paint. In the 1940s, he was actively involved in the Goa liberation movement for which he was arrested thrice by the Portuguese colonials. He was beaten by the Portuguese police after being arrested and for this reason, his parents sent him to the city of Bombay where he studied at the Sir J. J. School of Art in Mumbai from 1943 to 1947. He was awarded the Mayo Medal in 1947. Pai offered a satyagraha outside the Margao Police Station in 1946.

Career
Soon after completing his studies, Pai started teaching at the Sir J. J. School of Art. At the same time, he participated in the activities of the Bombay Progressive Artists' Group, although he did not become its member. Pai recalls that once, a nude painting by Francis Newton Souza was objected to by the then Chief Minister of Bombay State, Morarji Desai. Due to Pai's association with Souza, he was demoted. Pai wrote a letter about it to the Sir J. J. School of Art but was told to drop his accusations against the Director. He declined to do so and was expelled as a result.

Subsequently, he wrote to S. H. Raza who was then in Paris. Raza made arrangements for Pai's arrival in Paris. Pai went to Paris and studied fresco and etching there. He studied at the prestigious École des Beaux-Arts and stayed in Paris for ten years. During his stay in Paris, Pai held ten solo exhibitions in the city.

He had to his credit more than 110 one-man shows across the globe. His solo exhibitions were held at London, Munich, Hanover, Stuttgart, New York City, Bremen, San Francisco, Bangkok, Kuala Lumpur, Singapore, New Delhi, Mumbai, Kolkata, Goa and São Paulo. Pai learnt Rosenthal porcelain art in Germany. He also participated in numerous Biennials in Paris, Tokyo, Sao Paulo.

Returning to India, he took up the post of the principal of the Goa College of Art in 1977 and served the institution until 1987. He was instrumental in creating the new college campus in Altinho area of Panaji.

Pai's works
From 1947 to 1950 Pai was largely inspired by Goan subjects and the concept of Indian miniatures. His initial works speak about the Goan way of life, as can be seen from his paintings depicting the 'Zambaulim Shigmo' or the process of feni-making. Pai was also inspired by ancient Egyptian sculptures. He listened to music when he painted. His favourites included Kumar Gandharv, Bhimsen Joshi and Kishori Amonkar. Pai painted various paintings based on different ragas of Indian classical music. In his works, he gives a visual interpretation to the moods of the music as determined by the vibrations of the notes. His painting series,'Musical Moods' (1965) was inspired by Indian classical ragas. Pai used to also play the sitar and the bansuri.

His paintings are in the collection of Ben and Abby Grey Foundation, New York Public Library, Berlin Museum, Centre national des arts plastiques, Madras Museum, Nagpur Museum, National Gallery of Modern Art, New Delhi, and Punjab University Museum.

Personal life 
Pai married Purnima, whom he had met earlier in Shimla, at the age of 40. The couple had a son. His wife had predeceased him.

Death 
Pai died on 14 March 2021, at his home in Dona Paula in Goa. He was aged 95.

Awards
 Lalit Kala Akademi award, three times (1961, 1963, 1972)
 Padma Shri awards, Government of India (1985)
 State Award of the Government of Goa
 Nehru Award (1995)
 Gomant Vibhushan Award, Goa's highest civilian award.
 
 
 Padma Bhushan

See also

 Sadanand Bakre
 Syed Haider Raza
 Francis Newton Souza
 Akbar Padamsee

References

Recipients of the Padma Shri in arts
1926 births
Sir Jamsetjee Jeejebhoy School of Art alumni
Modern painters
2021 deaths
20th-century Indian painters
People from Margao
Painters from Goa
Recipients of the Padma Bhushan in arts
21st-century Indian painters
21st-century male artists
Indian male painters
20th-century Indian male artists
21st-century Indian male artists